Jörgen Kolni (19 July 1946 – 10 February 2022) was a Swedish sailor. He competed at the 1968 Summer Olympics and the 1976 Summer Olympics.

Kolni died on 10 February 2022 in Hovås, Göteborg.

References

External links
 

1946 births
2022 deaths
Swedish male sailors (sport)
Olympic sailors of Sweden
Sailors at the 1968 Summer Olympics – Flying Dutchman
Sailors at the 1976 Summer Olympics – Tornado
Sportspeople from Copenhagen